Magomed Idrisovich Ibragimov (born 2 June 1985) is a Russian-born naturalized Uzbekistani wrestler of Avar descent, who competes in the heavyweight freestyle division. He won bronze medals at the 2016 Olympics and 2018 Asian Games.

Ibragimov took up wrestling at age 12 in Makhachkala, Russia, and studied at the Dagestan State Pedagogical University there. In 2005, he defeated Khabib Nurmagomedov by judge's decision at the Russian Combat Sambo Championship, competing in the under- category. The 20-year-old Magomed represented the Republic of Chechnya, while the 17-year-old Khabib, who is also from the Makhachkala region of Dagestan, represented Dagestan. He would be the only fighter to ever defeat the now-retired Khabib.

Ibragimov initially represented Russia, but in 2016 received Uzbekistani citizenship. He was selected for the 2016 Olympics in May 2016 by winning the second place at the qualification tournament in Ulaanbaatar.

References

External links
 

Olympic wrestlers of Uzbekistan
Russian male sport wrestlers
Wrestlers at the 2016 Summer Olympics
Medalists at the 2016 Summer Olympics
Olympic medalists in wrestling
Olympic bronze medalists for Uzbekistan
1985 births
Living people
People from Charodinsky District
Wrestlers at the 2018 Asian Games
Medalists at the 2018 Asian Games
Asian Games medalists in wrestling
Asian Games bronze medalists for Uzbekistan
Wrestlers at the 2020 Summer Olympics
Sportspeople from Dagestan